The Halmidi inscription is the oldest known Kannada-language inscription in the Kadamba script. While estimates vary slightly, the inscription is often dated to between 450 CE - 500 CE. The inscription was discovered in 1936 by Dr. M. H. Krishna, the Director of Archaeology of the (princely) State of Mysore (present-day Karnataka region of India), in Halmidi, a village in the Hassan district.

The original inscription is kept in the Office of the Director of Archaeology and Museums, Govt. of Karnataka, Mysore, and a fibreglass replica has been installed in Halmidi.

Discovery and dating 

In a report published in a Mysore Archaeological Department Report (MAR) in 1936, Krishna dated the inscription to 450 AD, on paleographical grounds.  Later scholars have variously dated the inscription to 450 AD, 470 AD, 500 AD, "about 500", and "end of the fifth century A. D. or the beginning of the 6th century A.D." Epigraphist, D. C. Sircar has dated the inscription to "about the end of the 6th century."

Epigraphist, K. V. Ramesh has written about the differing estimates:

He also hypothesized that, compared to possibly contemporaneous Sanskrit inscriptions,  "Halmidi inscription has letters which are unsettled and uncultivated, no doubt giving an impression, or rather an illusion, even to the trained eye, that it is, in date, later than the period to which it really belongs, namely the fifth century A.D."

Epigraphist G. S. Gai however disagrees with the view that Halmidi is a record of the Kadamba dynasty identified with King Kadamba Kakusthavarman.

Textual analysis 

The inscription is in verse form indicating the authors of the inscription had a good sense of the language structure. The inscription is written in pre-old Kannada (Puruvada-hala Kannada), which later evolved into old Kannada, middle Kannada and eventually modern Kannada.  The Halmidi inscription is the earliest evidence of the usage of Kannada as an administrative language.

Text

The following lines are carved on the front of the pillar:

1.   
2.   
3.   
4.   
5.   
6.   
7.   
8.   
9.   
10.  
11.   
12.   
13.   
14.   
15.  

The following line is carved on the pillar's left face:

16.

Notes

See also
Indian inscriptions
Indian copper plate inscriptions

References

External links

 Editio princeps: Annual Report of the Mysore Archaeological Department for the Year 1936. Bangalore: The Government Press, 1938. Pages 72–74. [photographic facsimile, transliteration and translation (into English)]
Banavasi Old Kannada Inscription
Halmidi Inscription
Halmidi village finally on the road to recognition
Language of the Inscriptions — Archaeological Survey of India [The last sentence of second last paragraph mentions the Halmidi inscription.]

Kannada literature
Literature of Karnataka
Earliest known manuscripts by language
Kadamba inscriptions
5th-century inscriptions
5th-century literature
Kannada inscriptions